Fitches Creek is an affluent coastal neighbourhood in Antigua and Barbuda.  It is located on the island of Antigua.
Named for the English surname Fitch (English surname) who may have originally owned the surrounding land.
The surrounding area is now a neighborhood in the parish of St George's.

Demographics
The area is also an enumeration district, and statistical data for "Fitches Creek" is widely available. "Fitches Creek ED", or "ED 41800" has a population of 125, has a living condition index (unmet basic needs index) of 19.18, and an unemployment rate of 4.23.

Fitches Creek is "high-income", and has an income weight of 3.29 and 100% of households own computers (compared to 64.14% of households who have internet access). There are 112 households. 28.30% of residents aged 24 or older have tertiary education.

See also
List of rivers of Antigua and Barbuda

References

Rivers of Antigua and Barbuda
Saint George Parish, Antigua and Barbuda